Andrew "Andy" Bussey (born February 5, 1979 in Norfolk, Virginia) is an American sprint canoer who competed in the mid-2000s. At the 2004 Summer Olympics, he was eliminated in the semifinals of the K-2 1000 m event.

References
Sports-Reference.com profile

1979 births
Sportspeople from Norfolk, Virginia
American male canoeists
Canoeists at the 2004 Summer Olympics
Living people
Olympic canoeists of the United States